Cavazos is a Spanish and Italian surname. Notable people with the surname include:

Andy Cavazos (born 1981) U.S. Baseball pitcher
David Cavazos (born 1987), Mexican singer-songwriter
Eloy Cavazos, a.k.a. "The Little Giant" (born 1949), Mexican matador
José E. Cavazos, Mexican-American physician-scientist
Lauro Cavazos (born 1927), U.S. educator
Lumi Cavazos (born 1968), Mexican actress
Richard E. Cavazos (born 1929), U.S. Army general
Ruben Cavazos, a.k.a. "Doc" (born 1957), U.S. criminal, Mongols Motorcycle Club president
Silverio Cavazos (1968–2010), Mexican politician, Governor of Colima
Julia Carin Cavazos a.k.a. Julia Michaels (born 1993), American Singer-Songwriter
Joe Ray Cavazos (2001), Descendant of Galicia Natives, Father being from Puerto Rico, Originally from Texas, PFC in the U.S. Army as an Airborne Cavalry Scout

See also
Eloy Cavazos (Monterrey Metro), train station located in Guadalupe, Nuevo León, Mexico